Alan William Jones  (born 5 March 1940) is an Episcopal priest and Dean Emeritus of Grace Cathedral in San Francisco. A prominent lecturer in Episcopalian and academic circles both nationally and internationally. He is a prolific writer of books, articles, and editorial opinions.

Early life
Born in London, England, Jones is the son of the late Edward Augustus and Blanche Hilda (Hunt) Jones. Now a U.S. citizen, Jones received both his MA and Ph.D. from the University of Nottingham. His Ph.D thesis explored the Catholicism of Herbert Hamilton Kelly, founder of the Society of the Sacred Mission.

Ordained ministry
Jones was a faculty member of Lincoln Theological College between 1968 and 1971. He subsequently 
served as the Stephen F. Bayne Professor of Ascetical Theology at the General Theological Seminary in New York City from 1972 to 1982. During his tenure, he founded and was the first director of the Center for Christian Spirituality.  Jones was the Dean of the Episcopal Grace Cathedral in San Francisco from 1985 until January 2009. Jones also moderated The Forum at Grace Cathedral.

Personal life
Jones first marriage was to Josephine Franklin Jones, the daughter of Newbery Award-winning author Madeleine L'Engle together they had two daughters and a son. They were divorced in 1997. He married Virginia "Cricket" Franche Jones, an interior designer, in 1999.

References

American Episcopal theologians
20th-century English theologians
Living people
Alumni of the University of Nottingham
1940 births
English Anglican theologians
General Theological Seminary faculty
British expatriates in the United States
Officers of the Order of the British Empire